1900 K Street is a high-rise building located in Washington, D.C., United States. The building broke ground in 1995, with its construction being completed in 1996. The architect of the building was Cesar Pelli & Associates Architects, who designed the postmodern architectural style of the building, which is built with glass and steel material. The building serves for office use. The building is managed by Hines, Inc.

See also
List of tallest buildings in Washington, D.C.

References

External links
  Archived

Office buildings completed in 1996
Skyscraper office buildings in Washington, D.C.
César Pelli buildings
1996 establishments in Washington, D.C.